Alexander Thomas may refer to:

 Alex Thomas (born 1978), musician
Sandy Thomas, Emmerdale character
Alexander Thomas (sport shooter) from 2013 European 10 m Events Championships

See also